Pets United is a 2019 computer-animated comedy film animated film directed and written by Reinhard Klooss and starring Natalie Dormer, Eddie Marsan and Jeff Burrell. It serves as a standalone sequel to the 2010 film Animals United.

The film premiered in China on November 8, 2019. In the United States, Netflix added the film to its streaming service on September 11, 2020, and was panned by critics.

Cast 
 Patrick Roche as Roger (speaking voice and vocal effects), a Robin hood-esque blue heeler, and the main protagonist.
 Stephen Mangan as Bob, a robot with feelings "that was not the most successful business idea".
 Natalie Dormer as Belle (speaking voice and vocal effects), a Siamese cat.
 Eddie Marsan as Frank Stone, Roger's long-lost owner, and The Mayor, Frank Stone's evil cyborg counterpart, the main antagonist.
 Jeff Burrell as Ronaldo, a black and white Italian-accented poodle.
 Harvey Friedman as Walter, a pug.
 Ian Odle as Sheriff Bill, a robot policeman who chases after Roger but fails at every turn, and Brian, a elderly Chinese-accented tarsier.
 Bryan Larkin as Beezer, a Scottish-accented proboscis monkey, and as Slomo, a red panda obsessed with smoothies.
 Naomi McDonald as Joy, and Chichi, a Chihuahua.
 John Tara as Tiger, a hamster.
 Andres Williams as Edgar, a guinea pig with a pink ribbon, and as Victor, a dim-witted Komodo dragon.
 Teresa Gallagher as Sophie (speaking voice and vocal effects), a hillbilly bushpig.
 Frank Schaff as Asgar (speaking voice and vocal effects), a Russian-accented Siberian tiger.
 Tom Haywood as Stan, a hysterical spotted hyena.
 Mike Ryan as Boris, an armored robot who is one of The Mayor's henchmen, until he turns against him.

Plot
In a place called Robotic City, Roger tries to get himself some chicken drumsticks, but he instead successfully gives boxes of cat food to stray cats in the alley. Then, he gets taken to a place called Pampered Pets where he encounters various pets. They have a mission to stop the mastermind of chaos.

Release 
Pets United was released on November 8, 2019 in China.

Reception

Pets United earned $4,440,894 at the global box office.

Roger Moore of "Movie Nation" gave it 1.5 out of 4 and wrote : "Could struggle a bit even to keep a toddler distracted for 92 minutes."

References

External links 
 
 

Animated films about dogs
Animated films about cats
Films about animals
Animated films about robots
German animated films
2019 animated films
2019 computer-animated films
Films directed by Reinhard Klooss
Films based on works by Erich Kästner
Films about pets
2019 films
Films scored by David Newman
Animated post-apocalyptic films
2010s English-language films
2010s German films